Ceratophyllus hirundinis is a species of flea in the family Ceratophyllidae. It was described by John Curtis in 1826.

References 

Ceratophyllidae
Insects described in 1826